Crosspicking is a technique for playing the mandolin or guitar using a plectrum or flatpick in a rolling, syncopated style across three strings. This style is probably best known as one element of the flatpicking style in bluegrass music, and it closely resembles a banjo roll, the main difference being that the banjo roll is fingerpicked rather than flatpicked. 

A typical element of the technique is the use of three pitches played repeatedly within a four-pulse rhythm. This results in a continual shifting of the pitches vis-a-vis the accented pulse. The three pitches are usually played on three adjacent strings—one per string. The pick direction can vary, depending on the required emphasis and the melody.

Using "D" for down" and "U" for "up" (and slashes to indicate groups of three), mandolin player Jesse McReynolds used a crosspicking roll of
D - U - U / D - U - U / D - U . . .
creating a repeating pattern of notes that expresses the melody. Guitarist George Shuffler used a pick pattern of
D - D - U / D - D - U / D - D . . . .

The traditional banjo roll form is
D - D - U / D - D - U / D - D . . .
this helps to accentuate the "threes" nature of the pattern against the "four" rhythm. 

The other way is using strict alternate picking:
D - U - D / U - D - U / D - U. . . .
This may be more comfortable for players who are using alternate picking for most of their playing. In actuality, one (or more) of the three pitches may be varied from one repetition of the pattern to the next, for instance the top note could be toggled up and down one step.

Mandolin
McReynolds was the earliest exponent of the crosspicking bluegrass style on the mandolin.  He developed his crosspicking style with his brother in the band Jim & Jesse.  McReynolds influenced later mandolin players such as Sam Bush.

Guitar
George Shuffler introduced crosspicking to the acoustic guitar; Shuffler developed the technique as a "fill" for back-up and leads while playing with the Stanley Brothers.  Among the most well-known crosspickers are Doc Watson and Clarence White, whose styles influenced other guitarists, including Tony Rice. 

Among rock guitarists, King Crimson Robert Fripp has made cross-picking a signature technique, which has influenced many other guitarists, particularly in progressive rock. Fripp teaches the technique to his students in Guitar Craft.

See also
 Drum roll
 Guitar picking
 Hybrid picking
 Scruggs style

Notes

References
 

Guitar performance techniques